Gudgudee is an Indian television series that was telecast on Zee TV.

Cast 
 Ajit Vachani as Mohan Shukla
 Himani Shivpuri as Durga Shukla
 Ninad Kamat as Raghu Shukla
 Resham Tipnis as Kanchan Shukla (Raghu's wife)
 Bhairavi Raichura as Nikki
 Atul Srivastava as Dhakkan
 Manoj Pahwa as Raghu's mama (uncle)
 Tanaaz Currim as Different roles
 Jatin Kanakia
 Anand Goradia

References

Zee TV original programming
Indian drama television series